Tomáš Pospíchal (26 June 1936 in Pudlov - 21 October 2003 in Prague) was a Czech football player.

Pospíchal played for several clubs, including TJ Vítkovice (1952–1955), Baník Ostrava (1957–1964), Sparta Prague (1964–1968) and FC Rouen (1968–1971).

He played for Czechoslovakia national team (26 matches and 8 goals), and was a participant at the 1962 FIFA World Cup, where he played in the last three matches.

After ending his career as a player he started coaching. Pospíchal coached several top Czech clubs, including Baník Ostrava (1972–1975), Bohemians Praha (1977–1987) and Slavia Prague (1987–1988). He won Czechoslovak League with Bohemians in 1983.

Pospíchal is credited with his famous saying: "Football has no logic" (Fotbal nemá logiku).

References 
 
  Profile at SK Slavia Praha
  Profile at weltfussball.de

1936 births
2003 deaths
People from Bohumín
Czech footballers
Czechoslovak footballers
Czechoslovakia international footballers
Czech football managers
Czechoslovak football managers
1962 FIFA World Cup players
AC Sparta Prague players
FC Baník Ostrava players
MFK Vítkovice players
FC Rouen players
Ligue 1 players
Czechoslovak expatriate footballers
Expatriate footballers in France
People from Cieszyn Silesia
FC Baník Ostrava managers
FC Viktoria Plzeň managers
SK Slavia Prague managers
Bohemians 1905 managers
Czechoslovak expatriate sportspeople in France
Association football forwards
Sportspeople from the Moravian-Silesian Region